Brad Gilbert was the defending champion, but lost in the first round this year.

Mikael Pernfors won the title, defeating Glenn Layendecker 6–2, 6–4 in the final.

Seeds

  Brad Gilbert (first round)
  Kevin Curren (semifinals)
  Mikael Pernfors (champion)
  Dan Goldie (second round)
  Jay Berger (first round)
  Michael Chang (second round)
  Mark Woodforde (second round)
  Derrick Rostagno (quarterfinals)

Draw

Finals

Top half

Bottom half

External links
 Main draw

Singles